The Biddle football team represented Biddle University (now known as Johnson C. Smith University) in American football. The team was founded in 1892.

1910–1911
Biddle did not compete in collegiate football in any of the seasons from 1893 to 1911.

1912

The 1912 Biddle football team represented Biddle University in the 1912 college football season as an independent. In their first season since 1892, Biddle played one game, losing 2–13 against Livingstone College.

Schedule

1913

1914

The 1914 Biddle football team represented Biddle University in the 1914 college football season as an independent. Biddle played one game, losing against rival Livingstone.

Schedule

1915

The 1915 Biddle football team represented Biddle University in the 1915 college football season as an independent. Biddle played one game, losing against rival Livingstone in an annual Thanksgiving game.

Schedule

1916

1917

1918–1919
Biddle did not play college football from 1918 to 1919.

References

1910-1919
1910 in sports in North Carolina
1911 in sports in North Carolina
1912 in sports in North Carolina
1913 in sports in North Carolina
1914 in sports in North Carolina
1915 in sports in North Carolina
1916 in sports in North Carolina
1917 in sports in North Carolina
1918 in sports in North Carolina
1919 in sports in North Carolina
1910 college football season
1911 college football season
1912 college football season
1913 college football season
1914 college football season
1915 college football season
1916 college football season
1917 college football season
1918 college football season
1919 college football season